Olivia Theresa Longott (born February 15, 1981) is an American R&B singer. She is best known for performing with the hip hop group G-Unit and also known as a cast member on the VH1 reality television series Love & Hip Hop: New York.

Early life 
Olivia Theresa Longott was born on February 15, 1981, in Brooklyn, New York. Longott is mixed of Indian, Jamaican, and Cuban descent. She studied music at Bayside High School, in Queens and at Five Towns College in Dix Hills, New York. She began her performing career in her teenage years.

Career

J Records (2000–2004) 
In 2000, Olivia became the first artist signed to Clive Davis' J Records. Her self-titled debut album Olivia was released in 2001 and featured the singles "Bizounce" which made #15 on the charts, and "Are U Capable". The album debuted at No. 55 on the Billboard 200.

G-Unit (2004–2007) 

Olivia was signed to G-Unit from 2004 to 2007. Her best known song from this period is "Candy Shop" with 50 Cent. She also released the singles "So Sexy" and "Twist It" (with Lloyd Banks) on the label.

2007–present 
 
In 2007, it was announced Olivia and G-Unit Records had parted ways. Her second studio album Behind Closed Doors was shelved, but leaked a year later on several mixtape websites. In 2009, Olivia did a feature for Congolese singer Fally Ipupa on his song "Chaise Électrique" which was on the top of the Congolese and African Hits. On April 12, 2011, she released her first music video for "December" the first single from her then-upcoming album, Show the World. The song peaked at No. 76 on the Billboard Hot R&B/Hip-Hop Songs Chart, higher than her G-Unit debut single, "Twist It".

In December 2011, she released her second single "Walk Away". During this time, she became a cast member on VH1's Love & Hip Hop, which chronicled her career struggles as an independent artist.

Olivia declined a record deal from label EMI and in April 2012, signed a deal with Jerry Wonda's Wonda Music. She has since released two promotional songs: "Soldier Girl" (featuring Mavado) and "Sun Don't Shine" (featuring Sean Kingston). In 2013, Olivia's song "Where Do I Go from Here?" hit iTunes at the No. 10 spot on the R&B/Soul charts.

After a seven-year hiatus, Olivia returned to Love & Hip Hop: New York for its tenth anniversary season.

Discography 

Studio albums
 Olivia (2001)

Filmography

References

External links 

 
 

1981 births
American contemporary R&B singers
American people of Jamaican descent
American entertainers of Cuban descent
American women singers of Indian descent
Hispanic and Latino American women singers
Hofstra University alumni
Living people
Singers from New York City
Musicians from Brooklyn
American television actresses
Hispanic and Latino American people in television
Participants in American reality television series
21st-century American women singers
21st-century American singers
Bayside High School (Queens) alumni
American women hip hop singers

Early life 
Olivia Theresa Longott was born in Brooklyn, New York. Longott is mixed of Indian, Jamaican, and Cuban descent. She studied music at Bayside High School, in Queens and at Five Towns College in Dix Hills, New York. She began her performing career in her teenage years.

Career

J Records (2000–2004) 
In 2000, Olivia became the first artist signed to Clive Davis' J Records. Her self-titled debut album Olivia was released in 2001 and featured the singles "Bizounce" which made #15 on the charts, and "Are U Capable". The album debuted at No. 55 on the Billboard 200.

G-Unit (2004–2007) 

Olivia was signed to G-Unit from 2004 to 2007. Her best known song from this period is "Candy Shop" with 50 Cent. She also released the singles "So Sexy" and "Twist It" (with Lloyd Banks) on the label.

2007–present 
 
In 2007, it was announced Olivia and G-Unit Records had parted ways. Her second studio album Behind Closed Doors was shelved, but leaked a year later on several mixtape websites. In 2009, Olivia did a feature for Congolese singer Fally Ipupa on his song "Chaise Électrique" which was on the top of the Congolese and African Hits. On April 12, 2011, she released her first music video for "December" the first single from her then-upcoming album, Show the World. The song peaked at No. 76 on the Billboard Hot R&B/Hip-Hop Songs Chart, higher than her G-Unit debut single, "Twist It".

In December 2011, she released her second single "Walk Away". During this time, she became a cast member on VH1's Love & Hip Hop, which chronicled her career struggles as an independent artist.

Olivia declined a record deal from label EMI and in April 2012, signed a deal with Jerry Wonda's Wonda Music. She has since released two promotional songs: "Soldier Girl" (featuring Mavado) and "Sun Don't Shine" (featuring Sean Kingston). In 2013, Olivia's song "Where Do I Go from Here?" hit iTunes at the No. 10 spot on the R&B/Soul charts.

After a seven-year hiatus, Olivia returned to Love & Hip Hop: New York for its tenth anniversary season.

Discography 

Studio albums
 Olivia (2001)

Filmography

References

External links 

 
 

1981 births
American contemporary R&B singers
American people of Jamaican descent
American entertainers of Cuban descent
American women singers of Indian descent
Hispanic and Latino American women singers
Hofstra University alumni
Living people
Singers from New York City
Musicians from Brooklyn
American television actresses
Hispanic and Latino American people in television
Participants in American reality television series
21st-century American women singers
21st-century American singers
Bayside High School (Queens) alumni
American women hip hop singers